Spectracanthicus punctatissimus is a species of armored catfish endemic to Brazil where it is found in the Xingu River basin.  This species grows to a length of  SL.

References

Ancistrini
Fish of South America
Fish of Brazil
Endemic fauna of Brazil
Fish described in 1881